The Journal of Planning Education and Research is a peer-reviewed academic journal that publishes papers in the field of planning. The editors-in-chief are Clinton J. Andrews and Frank Popper. The journal was established in 1981 and is published by SAGE Publications in association with the Association of Collegiate Schools of Planning. It focuses on topics such as planning practice, planning theory, and planning pedagogy and publishes articles reporting original and current research, commentaries, and book reviews.

Abstracting and indexing
The journal is abstracted and indexed in Scopus and the Social Sciences Citation Index. According to the Journal Citation Reports, its 2017 impact factor is 2.328, ranking it 16th out of 57 journals in the category  "Planning & Development".

References

External links

Association of Collegiate Schools of Planning Official website

SAGE Publishing academic journals
English-language journals
Quarterly journals
Publications established in 1981
Business and management journals
Urban studies and planning journals